Bradley Boatright (born 1976) is an American musician, record producer, and mastering engineer based in Portland, Oregon.

Boatright is known for his work as a guitarist and vocalist in From Ashes Rise and The Cooters, and as a mastering engineer at Audiosiege, credited on recordings by Off!, American Standards, Sleep, Noothgrush, Pierced Arrows, and more.

On December 25, 2011, he launched his own recording label, Audiosiege Media, which is a division of Moshpit Tragedy Records. Many Audiosiege releases will feature production from Brad's studio in Portland.

Discography (as musician)

With The Cooters
 S/T 7-inch EP Assault With Intent To Free (1994)
 Grisham's Army(1995)
 Invasion of The Cooters (1996)
 The Moon Will Rise Again (1998)

With From Ashes Rise (guitar/vocals)
 Fragments of a Fallen Sky 7-inch EP Clean Plate Records (1997)
 Life And Death 7-inch EP Partners in Crime Records (1998)
 Concrete And Steel LP Feral Ward Records (2000)
 Silence LP Feral Ward Records (2001)
 Split LP with Victims Havoc Records (2002)
 Nightmares LP Jade Tree Records (2003)
 Live Hell LP Jade Tree Records (2010)

With Lebanon (vocals/guitar)
 Overdose/Overload 7-inch Single Southern Lord Records (2009)

With Warcry (guitar)
 Harvest of Death 7-inch EP Feral Ward Records (2002)
 Maniacs on Pedestals LP Feral Ward Records (2004)
 Deprogram LP Feral Ward Records (2006)

With World Burns to Death (guitar)
 The Sucking of the Missile Cock... LP Hardcore Holocaust Records (2002)
 No Dawn Comes ... Night Without End 7-inch EP Prank Records (2003)
 Art of self-destruction 7-inch EP Hardcore Holocaust Records (2003)

With No Parade (guitar/vocals)
 Nightsticks And Justice EP Partners in Crime Records (2000)
 Ceaseless Fire LP Partners in Crime Records (2001)

With Deathreat (bass)
 The Severing of the Last Barred Window LP Partners in Crime Records (1999)
 Consider It War LP Partners in Crime Records (2001)
 Double Death Blow- Split 7-inch with D.S.B. Mangrove Records (2001)

References

External links
 audiosiegepdx.com – AudioSiege's official website.
 From Ashes Rise – From Ashes Rise website.

1976 births
Living people
Record producers from Oregon
People from Oxford, Mississippi